The Jan Shatabdi Express is a more affordable and economical version of the Shatabdi Express. The word 'Jan' refers to common people. Being an economical version of the Shatabdi Express, it provides the passenger with Air Conditioned Chair Car, Second Class Seating and Unreserved classes. Though its priority is less than that of the trains like Rajdhani Express, Shatabdi Express and Duronto Express, but its enjoys a greater priority than the Mail, Express and the Superfast Express trains of Indian Railways. The maximum permissible speed of this train is 130 km/hr.

Active services

Gallery

See also

References

Further reading

External links 

 Indian Railway – Official Website
List of Jan Shatabdi Express on India Rail Info